Klaus-Otto Nagorsnik (born 29 July 1955 in Billerbeck) is a German quiz player and a former librarian. Since 2013 he is a member of the German Quizzing Association (founded in 2011) and has participated in several national and international competitions. He is known to German television audiences through his regular appearances on the quiz show Gefragt – Gejagt.

Life 
Nagorsnik, child of a working-class family, has five younger siblings. At the Nepomucenum High School in Coesfeld he graduated from high school and then studied History and Ethnology in Berlin. He broke off his studies after eight semesters and instead learned the profession of a bookseller at Coppenrath & Boeser in Münster. He has been a librarian at the city library at Münster from 1983 to 2021. He was in charge of the mobile library there from 1984 to 1997.

Quiz Achievements 

 (second-best German participant)

Nagorsnik won the Germany Cup several times in the German Quizzing Association. As a single player or together with a partner, he takes part in the annual German Quizzing Championship with varying successes. He is the organizer of a monthly pub quiz that takes place in various bars in the city of Münster and works on the questions.

Chaser 
As a chaser at Gefragt – Gejagt, the German adaptation of The Chase, Klaus Otto Nagorsnik bears the battle name „Der Bibliothekar“. His distinguishing features are a well-groomed beard and wearing bow ties with the jacket. He has been on the show regularly since 2014 and had 105 appearances (as of the end of March 2020). He was able to win 69 of his appearances, around 66 percent. In the remaining 34 percent, Nagorsnik's opposing team won an average of 5,456 euros per appearance, which was rather at the lower end of the profit potential compared to the other chasers.

For every appearance in the quiz show, he receives a fee from the television station; the sums he offers to the quiz participants are coordinated with the management of the television station within a span, i. e. Nagorsnik does not have to pay anything out of pocket.

References

External links 
  Ratefuchs from Münster chases candidates on TV  on www.die-glocke.de (local news from Münster).
 Thomas Heusner: The quiz champion Klaus Otto Nagorsnik on www.youtube.com; 2:56 minutes.
 Alexander Bommes in an interview with Klaus Otto Nagorsnik, 2016 on Das Erste.

Quiz championship players
German sportspeople
Living people
1955 births
German game players
People from Münster